Global Vision is a Canadian non-profit organization founded in 1991 by Terry Clifford, two-term Member of Parliament for the London—Middlesex riding (1984 - 1993).

Its flagship program, "Junior Team Canada", was modelled after Team Canada, a national government trade mission program led by the Prime Minister. Youth delegates are selected in a nationwide competition for economic missions abroad.

Past missions have been led to Brazil, South Korea, Vietnam, Colombia, Peru, Germany, China, England, Texas, India, Philippines, Malaysia, Singapore, and Hong Kong.

External links
Global Vision Homepage

Non-profit organizations based in Ontario
Organizations established in 1991
1991 establishments in Ontario
Youth organizations based in Canada